Sri Kasi Vishwanatha Temple Flint is a Hindu temple located in Flint, Michigan. The temple serves thousands of Hindus in the Flint Metropolitan Area and the surrounding regions.

Design
The temple is 65 feet tall at its peak with more than 126 deities sculpted into the facade of the temple, several of which are also represented by Mutris inside. It has carvings on every single pillar of various Hindu deities and is made almost entirely out of white limestone. The interior boasts a prayer hall and a Cafeteria.

References 
 

  
Buildings and structures in Genesee County, Michigan 
Hinduism in the United States
Asian-American culture in Michigan
Indian-American culture in Michigan